Mkhitar Manukyan (born 20 September 1973) is a retired Armenian-Kazakh Greco-Roman wrestler. He competed at the 1996, 2000 and 2004 Olympics and won a bronze medal in 2004. He also won a world title in 1998 and 1999 and an Asian title in 1997 and 1999.

Biography
Mkhitar Manukyan was born 20 September 1973 in Leninakan (now Gyumri), Armenia. He took up Greco-Roman wrestling at the age of ten. Manukyan lost both of his parents and a sister in the 1988 Armenian earthquake. According to him, this tragedy helped him in wrestling. He became a junior world champion twice in 1990 and 1991. From 1993 to 1996, Manukyan was a member of the Armenia national Greco-Roman wrestling team. He won bronze medals at the 1995 World Wrestling Championships and 1996 European Wrestling Championships. Manukyan participated at the 1996 Summer Olympics in Atlanta, together with his brothers Aghasi and Samvel.

In 1997, Manukyan received an invitation from the Greco-Roman wrestling head coach of Kazakhstan, Daulet Turlykhanov, and moved to Almaty and continued to compete under the flag of Kazakhstan. In the same year, Manukyan won a gold medal at the 1997 Asian Wrestling Championships. He later won a gold medal at the 1998 World Wrestling Championships. In 1999, Manukyan became a two-time Asian and two-time World Champion at the 1999 Asian Wrestling Championships and 1999 World Wrestling Championships. Manukyan was recognized as the best fighter of the year for 1999 by the International Federation of Associated Wrestling Styles. He was one of the medal favorites for the 2000 Summer Olympics in Sydney, but in the preliminary stage of the competition, he lost to Juan Marén and came in seventh place.

In January 2001, Manukyan underwent a complex surgery on the cervical vertebrae due to a serious back injury, and could not recover to his previous level. Yet he was selected for the 2004 Summer Olympics and won a bronze medal. In the semifinal, he suffered his only loss to Seref Eroglu, while leading 3–2, and then defeated Jimmy Samuelsson.

Manukyan retired in 2005 to become an assistant coach, and later the head coach of the Kazakhstan Greco-Roman wrestling team.

Personal life
Manukyan is married to Arevik, an Armenian woman from Gyumri; they have a daughter named Nora who is a scholar.

References

External links

 About life 
 The last glimpse of the real struggle 
 Mkhitar Manukyan at the Olympic Games in 2004 

1973 births
Living people
Sportspeople from Gyumri
Kazakhstani male sport wrestlers
Armenian male sport wrestlers
Olympic wrestlers of Armenia
Olympic wrestlers of Kazakhstan
Wrestlers at the 1996 Summer Olympics
Wrestlers at the 2000 Summer Olympics
Wrestlers at the 2004 Summer Olympics
Olympic bronze medalists for Kazakhstan
Olympic medalists in wrestling
Medalists at the 2004 Summer Olympics
World Wrestling Championships medalists
Wrestlers at the 1998 Asian Games
Wrestlers at the 2002 Asian Games
Asian Games medalists in wrestling
Kazakhstani people of Armenian descent
Medalists at the 1998 Asian Games
Asian Games silver medalists for Kazakhstan
European Wrestling Championships medalists
Asian Wrestling Championships medalists